Santiago "Junjun" S. Cabatu, Jr. (born June 25, 1984) is a Filipino former professional basketball player. He played for the San Miguel Beermen in the Asean Basketball League until 2011. He is the son of Santiago "Sonny" Cabatu, Sr., who is a former PBA player and was the very first draft pick of the league in 1985. He played high school basketball at St. Vincent School of Quezon City along with his elder brother Christian Cabatu and some notable players like Percival Cendana and Christian Anlacan to name a few. They won the National Championship and represented Manila selection in the Palarong Pambansa 2000 where they finished 2nd place behind Cebu selection.

References

1984 births
Living people
Alaska Aces (PBA) players
Barangay Ginebra San Miguel players
Basketball players from Cagayan
Filipino men's basketball players
People from Cagayan
Philippine Patriots players
Rain or Shine Elasto Painters players
Power forwards (basketball)
Small forwards
De La Salle Green Archers basketball players